Manpreet Singh can refer to:

Sports
 Manpreet Singh (field hockey) (born 1992), Indian field hockey player
 Manpreet Singh (Italian cricketer) (born 1985), Italian cricketer
 Manpreet Singh (Singaporean cricketer) (born 1994), Singaporean cricketer
 Manpreet Singh (boxer), Indian boxer